Calliandra laxa is a species of flowering plants of the genus Calliandra in the family Fabaceae.

References

laxa
Taxa named by George Bentham